Scopula karischi is a moth of the family Geometridae. It was described by Claude Herbulot in 1999. It is found on Bioko, an island of the west coast of Africa that is part of Equatorial Guinea.

References

Moths described in 1999
karischi
Fauna of Bioko
Moths of Africa
Endemic fauna of Equatorial Guinea
Taxa named by Claude Herbulot